Sarah “Sally” Meiklejohn Terry (born 1937) was a political science professor at Tufts University beginning in the fall of 1975 until her retirement on December 31, 2002.

Biography
A native of Newton, Massachusetts, Terry graduated with a BA from Cornell University (Phi Beta Kappa and Phi Kappa Phi). She went on to receive her M.A. and a Ph.D. from Harvard University in Soviet Studies and Political Science, respectively.

Bibliography
Poland’s Place in Europe: General Sikorski and the Origin of the Oder-Neisse Line, 1939-1943 (Princeton University Press, 1983) won the American Historical Association's George Louis Beer Prize in Modern European International History
Terry has edited and contributed to Soviet Policy in Eastern Europe (Yale University Press, 1984) and co-edited and contributed to The Soviet Empire Reconsidered: Essays in Honor of Adam B. Ulam (Westview Press, 1994)

References

Tufts University faculty
Cornell University alumni
Harvard University alumni
People from Newton, Massachusetts
Living people
1937 births
Women political scientists
American political scientists